Pietro Floridia (5 May 1860 in Modica – 16 August 1932 in New York City) was an Italian composer of classical music.

According to David Johnson (quoting the notes, by Luigi della Croce, to the Bongiovanni recording of Floridia's Symphony and other works), Floridia was born in Modica, Sicily, and studied in Naples, where he created his first opera, Carlotta Clepier.  He later destroyed the score of this work and entered further studies.  He wrote a symphony (his only one) in 1888, taught at the Palermo Conservatory of Music, and wrote operas Maruzza (produced in Venice in 1894) and La Colonia Libera with libretto by Luigi Illica (produced in Rome in 1899).

Floridia moved to the United States in 1904. From this point he made a living by teaching at the Cincinnati College of Music for some years, and then moved to New York City. During this period Floridia wrote and produced several more operas - Paoletta, written for the Cincinnati Industrial Exposition (1910), The Scarlet Letter at some time during the 1900s, and (written but unproduced) his last opera, Malia.  He also wrote incidental music, including to Oscar Wilde's A Florentine Tragedy; his music to this got a hearing in New York in 1917.

In 1914 while in New York City, he headed the Italian Symphony Orchestra.

Floridia died in Harkness Presbyterian Hospital in New York City in 1932.

Notes

Sources

External links
 

1860 births
1932 deaths
19th-century classical composers
20th-century classical composers
Italian classical composers
Italian male classical composers
Italian emigrants to the United States
Italian opera composers
Male opera composers
Italian Romantic composers
20th-century Italian composers
People from Modica
20th-century Italian male musicians
19th-century Italian male musicians
Musicians from the Province of Ragusa
Gennett Records artists